St Albans railway station is located on the Sunbury line in Victoria, Australia. It serves the western Melbourne suburb of St Albans, and opened on 1 February 1887.

History
St Albans station opened on 1 February 1887. It was provided at the request of a land development company that was sub-dividing the area. The company manager, Alfred Padley, asked for the station be named St Albans, apparently due to his forebears having an association with the English city of the same name.

Originally, only three trains each way passed through St Albans on weekdays, and passengers had to inform the train guard at the prior stop if they wanted to alight there. In 1888, a local service was provided, although it could not start operating to St Albans until 19 November of that year, when a single crossover was added, with tail-ropes probably used to shunt carriages with a locomotive on the adjacent track.

In 1898, that situation was resolved, when a second crossover was added and, by 1899, three non-interlocked signals had been provided in each direction, with the first proper signal box brought into use on 17 June 1901. Later, steam-era trains operated hourly from Flinders Street to Braybrook Junction, with eight of hose trains continuing to St Albans.

In October 1921, the station became the terminus of the electrified network from the city, and services were improved, with trains operating every 40 minutes by day and hourly at night.

The original station was located at the down end of the former Main Road level crossing, with all terminating electric trains using Platform 2. In 1959, the station was rebuilt, with an island platform built on the up side of the level crossing. One side faced the main line and the other side formed a dock platform for terminating suburban trains. The old westbound platform was removed, but the eastbound platform remained for Spencer Street-bound regional trains. Train stabling sidings were also provided around that time. In 1986, boom barriers replaced interlocked gates at the Main Road level crossing.

A signal box with a mechanical lever frame, now abolished, was located on the former island platform, to control access to the former back platform and sidings.

On 26 July 1996, St Albans was upgraded to a Premium Station.

In January 2002, as part of the extension of the electrified network to Sydenham, the platform that had been located at the down end of the level crossing was replaced by a new platform at the up end of the crossing.

In November 2012, after electrification of the line was extended to Sunbury, V/Line Bendigo services ceased stopping at St Albans, and Metro Trains terminating services also ceased, with Platform 3 no longer regularly used. The stabling yard was still used for train storage, until work on the grade separation project began in 2015.

In late 2015, the Level Crossing Removal Authority commenced a grade separation project that replaced the Main Road level crossing with a road bridge over a lowered rail line. On 1 November 2016, the rebuilt station opened, with the overall project completed by mid-2017. Roughly a third of the station was directly below Main Road, with the remainder also lowered.

Platforms and services
St Albans has two side platforms, located below ground level. It is served by Sunbury line trains.

Platform 1:
  all stations and limited express services to Flinders Street

Platform 2:
  all stations services to Watergardens and Sunbury

By late 2025, it is planned that trains on the Sunbury line will be through-routed with those on the Pakenham and Cranbourne lines, via the new Metro Tunnel.

Transport links
CDC Melbourne operates seven bus routes to and from St Albans station, under contract to Public Transport Victoria:
 : to Highpoint Shopping Centre
 : to Caroline Springs Square Shopping Centre
 : to Watergardens station
 : to Watergardens station
 : to Brimbank Central Shopping Centre
 : to Brimbank Central Shopping Centre
 : to Watergardens station

Gallery

References

External links
 
 Melway map at street-directory.com.au

Premium Melbourne railway stations
Railway stations in Melbourne
Railway stations in Australia opened in 1887
Railway stations in the City of Brimbank